Maruyama may refer to:

 Maruyama (surname), a Japanese surname and list of people with the name
 Maruyama, Chiba, a town in Japan
 Maruyama Park in Kyoto
 Mount Maru (disambiguation), a number of different mountains in Japan
 5147 Maruyama, an asteroid

See also
 Sannai-Maruyama Site, an archaeological site from the Jōmon period